Khotynetsky District is an administrative and municipal district (raion), one of the twenty-four in Oryol Oblast, Russia.

The area of the district is .Its administrative center is an urban-type settlement of Khotynets.Population: 9,376 (est. 2018).

Geography

Location 
Khotynetsky District located in the Central Russian Upland of the East European Plain, it is in the northwest of the oblast.

Borders with Khvastovichsky District (Kaluga Oblast) in the north, Znamensky District in the nord-east, Uritsky District in the south-east, Shablykinsky District in the south-west, and with Karachevsky District (Bryansk Oblast) in the west.

Climate 
District has a humid continental climate (Köppen climate classification — Dfb). Winters are moderately cold and changeable. The first half is softer second with often warmings. Summers is warm, in separate years — could be rainy or hot and droughty.

Demographics 

According to the Federal State Statistics Service, in January 2018 the number of residents came to 9 376. It is the 17th place among 24 districts of Oryol oblast for 2018.

The population of the administrative center accounts for 40.05% of the district's total population.

Largest ethnic group is Russians.

Transportation

Automotive 
Important highways of federal and regional values:
 
 54K-3
 54K-18

Railway 
On the territory of the Khotynetsky District is the historical Oryol-Vitebsk Railway.

Pipeline 
Through Khotynetsky District laid the Druzhba oil pipeline.

Landmarks 
The pearl of the Khotynetsky District is the national park «Orlovskoye Polesye».

Notable residents 

Alexei Badayev (1883–1951), Soviet politician, nominal head of RSFSR under Stalin; born in Yuryevo
Gennady Zyuganov (born 1944), politician, General Secretary of the Communist Party of the Russian Federation; born in the village of Mymrino

References

Notes

Sources 

Districts of Oryol Oblast